Pyae Moe (born 15 October 1992) is a footballer from Myanmar. He made his first appearance for the Myanmar national football team in 2007. In 2015, he moved to Zeyar Shwe Myae for contract end. In 2016 MNL second half season, he returned to Rakhine United.

References 

1992 births
Living people
Burmese footballers
Myanmar international footballers
Rakhine United F.C. players
Zeyashwemye F.C. players
Hanthawaddy United F.C. players
People from Mandalay Region
Association football goalkeepers